The Yunes River is a river in Utuado and Jayuya, Puerto Rico.

See also
List of rivers of Puerto Rico

References
Notes

Bibliography

External links
 USGS Hydrologic Unit Map – Caribbean Region (1974)
Rios de Puerto Rico

Rivers of Puerto Rico